Kenneth Mack Hayden (October 21, 1917 – August 1968) was an American football offensive lineman in the National Football League for the Philadelphia Eagles and the Washington Redskins.  He played college football at the University of Arkansas.

1917 births
1968 deaths
People from Hamburg, Arkansas
American football centers
Arkansas Razorbacks football players
Philadelphia Eagles players
Washington Redskins players